The Judgement of Isskar is a Big Finish Productions audio drama based on the long-running British science fiction television series Doctor Who.

Plot
The Key to Time must be sought again, due to the Doctor's carelessness during its last assembling.  The first stop in its search: Mars, home of the Ice Warriors.

Cast
The Doctor – Peter Davison
Amy – Ciara Janson
Zara – Laura Doddington
Isskar – Nicholas Briggs
Harmonious 14 Zink – Andrew Jones
Mesca – Raquel Cassidy
Thetris – Jeremy James
Wembik – Heather Wright

External links
Big Finish – The Judgement of Isskar
Den of Geek's reviews of Episodes One, Two, Three, and Four

2009 audio plays
Fifth Doctor audio plays
Fiction set on Mars